Auchterhouse Castle is a c. 13th century castle located northwest of Dundee, Angus, Scotland. The original castle was enclosed with walls, towers, and contained a keep. The castle may have been in ownership of the Ramsay family, who were hereditary Sheriffs of Angus. Sir William Wallace is alleged to have stayed at the castle and one its towers was named in his honour. King Edward I of England spent the night of the 20 July 1303 at the castle. The castle came into the possession of James Erskine, 7th Earl of Buchan who may have built the 17th century tower house.

References

Castles in Angus, Scotland
Buildings and structures completed in the 13th century
Clan Ogilvy